Technicians of the Sacred is the fourteenth studio album by English progressive rock band Ozric Tentacles, released on 11 May 2015 by Snapper Music's Madfish label. The album is the band's first double length album since Erpland.

Track listing

Disc 1

Disc 2

Personnel
 Ed Wynne – guitars, synthesizers, programming, production, engineering
 Silas Neptune – keyboards
 Brandi Wynne – bass
 Balázs Szende – drums
 Paul Hankin – percussion

References

External links
 Technicians of the Sacred at AllMusic
 official website.

2015 albums
Ozric Tentacles albums